Joseph Peter Newell (born 15 March 1993) is an English professional footballer who plays for Scottish Premiership club Hibernian as a midfielder. Newell has previously played for Peterborough United, St Albans City and Rotherham United.

Career

Peterborough United

Newell made his debut for Peterborough United on 25 April 2011, in a 2–2 draw at home to Yeovil Town. He made his second appearance in a 5–0 win against Dagenham & Redbridge on 7 May 2011. He began to establish himself in the team during the 2011–12 season, and scored his first goal for the club in an away match against Leeds United on 14 April 2012. He scored his second goal for the club on 14 August 2012, helping Peterborough to a 4–0 win against Southend United in the first round of the League Cup. Newell picked up the Peterborough United FC, BBC radio Cambridgeshire and away supporters player of the year awards for the 2014–15 season.

Rotherham United

On 5 August 2015, Newell joined Championship side Rotherham United on a three-year deal. After four years at the club, which included a Wembley play-off final win, he left at the end of the 2018–19 season.

Hibernian

He then signed a two-year contract with Scottish Premiership club Hibernian. He scored his first goal for the club in a Scottish League Cup tie against Elgin City on 26 July 2019. Newell initially struggled playing in a wide-left position, but his form improved after he was moved into a central midfield role. On 23 February 2021, Newell signed a new two and a half year deal with Hibernian, with the option to extend a further year.

Career statistics

Honours
Peterborough United
Football League Trophy: 2013–14

Rotherham United
EFL League One play-offs: 2018

Notes

References

External links
Profile at UpThePosh! The Peterborough United Database

1993 births
Living people
Sportspeople from Tamworth, Staffordshire
English footballers
Association football wingers
Birmingham City F.C. players
Peterborough United F.C. players
St Albans City F.C. players
Rotherham United F.C. players
English Football League players
National League (English football) players
Hibernian F.C. players
Scottish Professional Football League players